Rethinking Violence: States and Non-State Actors in Conflict is a collection of essays about violence and political conflicts, edited by Adria Lawrence and Erica Chenoweth. It has been reviewed in Perspectives on Politics, International Studies Review, Journal of Peace Research, Terrorism and Political Violence, Global Crime, Choice and the Air Force Research Institute.

The other contributors are Kristin M. Bakke, Emily Beaulieu, H. Zeynep Bulutgil, Kathryn McNabb Cochran, Kathleen Gallagher Cunningham, Alexander B. Downes, Erin K. Jenne, Harris Mylonas, Wendy Pearlman and Maria J. Stephan.

References

External links 
 Rethinking Violence

2010 non-fiction books
2010 anthologies
Essay anthologies
Books about nationalism
Books about democracy
Books about sovereignty
Books about violence
Books about war
Edited volumes
MIT Press books